Lench Mob Records is a record label owned by Los Angeles rapper and actor Ice Cube. Founded as Street Knowledge Records, it was once home to many of Cube's former allies such as DJ Pooh, and Lench Mob's own Chilly Chill, Del the Funky Homosapien, Kam, Yo-Yo and the group Da Lench Mob. The label, established in 1990, remained dormant for a long period until a revival in 2006 with the release of Ice Cube's album Laugh Now, Cry Later. Lench Mob Records also distributes Bigg Swang Records home to WC, DJ Crazy Toones, Young Maylay and Tha Trapp. Hallway Productionz have produced multiple tracks for the label's two major artists.

Releases

Current artists

Former artists 
 DJ Pooh
 DJ Crazy Toones
 Chilly Chill
 Threi
 Kausion
 Kam
 Yo Yo
 Del tha Funkee Homosapien
 Sir Jinx
 Mack 10
 Maulkie
 Shorty
 J Dee
 T-Bone
 K-Dee
 Dazzie Dee
 Renegadde
 Da Lench Mob
 Don Jagwarr
 Westside Connection

References

External links
Discogs entry

1990 establishments in California
Record labels established in 1990
Hip hop record labels
American independent record labels
Ice Cube
EMI
Gangsta rap record labels